The Congrinae are a subfamily of eels in the family Congridae.

Genera
 Acromycter Smith et Kanazawa, 1977.
 Bassanago Whitley, 1948.
 Bathycongrus Ogilby, 1898.
 Bathyuroconger Fowler, 1934.
 Blachea Karrer et Smith, 1980.
 Conger Bosc, 1817.
 Congrhynchus Fowler, 1934.
 Congriscus Jordan et Hubbs, 1925.
 Congrosoma Garman, 1899.
 Diploconger Kotthaus, 1968.
 Gnathophis Kaup, 1860.
 Japonoconger Asano, 1958.
 Lumiconger Castle et Paxton, 1984.
 Macrocephenchelys Fowler, 1934.
 Paruroconger Blache et Bauchot, 1976.
 Poeciloconger Günther, 1872
 Promyllantor Alcock, 1890.
 Pseudophichthys Roule, 1915.
 Rhynchoconger Jordan et Hubbs, 1925.
 Scalanago Whitley, 1935.
 Uroconger Kaup, 1856.
 Xenomystax Gilbert, 1891.

Congridae